The Keijo Maru (Japanese: 京城丸) was an auxiliary gunboat of the Imperial Japanese Navy during World War II.

History
She was laid down as a merchant ship by shipbuilder Uraga Senkyo and launched on 12 October 1939. In September 1941, she was requisitioned by the Imperial Japanese Navy and converted to an auxiliary gunboat, She participated in the Battle of the Coral Sea  and the Invasion of Tulagi in May 1942.

References

1939 ships
Ships built by Uraga Dock Company
Maritime incidents in June 1942
Ships sunk by American submarines